Wrestling Star Wars, also billed as BTW Star Wars, WCCW Star Wars and WCWA Star Wars was a series of professional wrestling supercard shows promoted by the Dallas, Texas based World Class Championship Wrestling (WCCW) from 1981 until 1988. From 1961 to 1981 the promotion was known as Big Time Wrestling (BTW) and World Class Wrestling Association (WCWA) from 1986 until 1989. WCCW held multiple Star Wars shows throughout the year, especially on or close to Independence Day, Labor Day, Thanksgiving and Christmas. None of the shows were broadcast live, but were instead taped for WCCW's weekly TV shows where several of the matches would air.

Dates, venues, and main events

References

Professional wrestling in Texas
Recurring sporting events established in 1981
World Class Championship Wrestling shows